Parita   is a town and corregimiento in Parita District, Herrera Province, Panama with a population of 3,723 as of 2010. It is the seat of Parita District. It was founded in 1556. Its population as of 1990 was 3,257; its population as of 2000 was 3,616.

References

External links
The Art of Precolumbian Gold: The Jan Mitchell Collection, an exhibition catalog from The Metropolitan Museum of Art (fully available online as PDF), which contains material on Parita

Corregimientos of Herrera Province
Populated places in Herrera Province
Populated places established in 1556
1556 establishments in the Spanish Empire